The Joseph Mielke House is a historic house in New Richmond, Wisconsin, United States. It was added to the National Register of Historic Places in 1988.

It is a one-and-a-half-story Dutch Colonial Revival-style house clad with clapboard.

Its hipped roof one car garage, on the alley, is a second contributing building.

References

Dutch Colonial Revival architecture in the United States
Houses in St. Croix County, Wisconsin
Houses on the National Register of Historic Places in Wisconsin
National Register of Historic Places in St. Croix County, Wisconsin